Dr. Ieva Bidermane (born 6 November 1984) is a Latvian football midfielder.

External links 
 

Latvian women's footballers
Women's association football midfielders
Latvia women's international footballers
1994 births
Living people